Tagarapuvalasa is a neighbourhood on the banks of River Gosthani is a part of Bheemunipatnam Municipality (BMC) in Andhra Pradesh.  It is located on the Kolkata–Chennai National Highway 16. National Highway 43 diverts from Maharajupeta village north of Tagarapuvalasa.

History
Traces of habitation and early trade in and around Tagarapuvalasa may be dated back to 3rd century BC or more as many Early Buddhist sites such as Pavurallakonda, Gudiwada Dibba, Cherukupalli Gutta and Pellikonda, are explored, documented and excavated near to this town along the River Gosthani. This area once flourished as Madhyama Kalinga region.

Geography
Tagarapuvalasa and Chittivalasa are twin towns and located at 17°55′52″N 83°25′44″E.

Transport

APSRTC routes

References

Neighbourhoods in Visakhapatnam
Towns in Visakhapatnam district
Road junctions in India